
Year 578 (DLXXVIII) was a common year starting on Saturday (link will display the full calendar) of the Julian calendar. The denomination 578 for this year has been used since the early medieval period, when the Anno Domini calendar era became the prevalent method in Europe for naming years.

Events 
 By place 

 Byzantine Empire 
 Byzantine–Sassanid War: A Byzantine army under command of Maurice (magister militum per Orientem) invades Upper Mesopotamia, and raids on both sides of the Tigris. He deports 70,000 captives from Hyrcania to Cyprus, and installs military colonists to guard the strategic locations.
 October 5 – Emperor Justin II dies after several periods of insanity. On the advice of his wife Sophia, he has raised his general Tiberius to the rank of co-emperor (Caesar). From December 574 he has ruled jointly with Sophia, and now succeeds them as emperor of the Byzantine Empire.
 Asia 
 Summer – Emperor Wu Di engages in military campaigns on two fronts: against the invading Göktürks to the north and against the Chen Dynasty in the south.   
 Wu Di, age 35, dies from an illness, and is succeeded by his eldest son Xuan Di as emperor of Northern Zhou.
 Kongō Gumi, the world's oldest construction company (578–2006), is founded in Osaka (Japan).

Central America
October 22 – Tzi-B'alam, who had been the ruler of the Mayan city state of Copán in Honduras, dies after a 25 year reign that began in May 553.

November 15 – K'ak' Chan Yopaat, becomes the new ruler of the Mayan city state of Copán in Honduras, and rules until his death 49 years later in 628.

Births

Deaths 
 July 30 – Jacob Baradaeus, bishop of Edessa
 October 5 – Justin II, Byzantine emperor
 Abdul Muttalib, grandfather of Islamic prophet Muhammad
 Wu Di, emperor of Northern Zhou (b. 543)
 Wu Mingche, general of the Chen Dynasty (b. 512)
 Wuffa, king of East Anglia (approximate date)
 Yuwen Xian, prince of Northern Zhou (b. 544)
 Approximate date -
 Bhavyaviveka, Indian Madhyamaka scholar
 Hatim al-Tai, Arabian poet
 John Malalas, Byzantine chronicler (b. c.491)

References